"On the Side of Angels" is a song written by Gary Burr and Gerry House, and recorded by American country music artist LeAnn Rimes.  It was released in October 1997 as the third and final single from her album You Light Up My Life: Inspirational Songs.  It was also later featured on her Greatest Hits (2003) album.

"Holiday in Your Heart" Promotion 
" On the Side of Angels" was featured in the 1997 TV movie "Holiday in Your Heart", which starred Rimes herself.  Being in the movie caused the song to gain unexpected success and acknowledgement, which caused some to consider the song as an "unofficial/promotional single". The live performance of the song from the movie has been misinterpreted on YouTube, often circulating around with the label "music video".

Musical style 
"On the Side of Angels" is a Christian love song. It is a slow ballad with very strong vocals and a powerful meaning.

Charts

Year-end charts

References

1997 singles
1997 songs
LeAnn Rimes songs
Songs written by Gary Burr
Songs written by Gerry House
Curb Records singles